Englehart (Dave's Field) Aerodrome  is located adjacent to Englehart, Ontario, Canada.

References

Registered aerodromes in Timiskaming District